Ridwan Awaludin (born October 10, 1992) is an Indonesian footballer who plays for Persebaya Surabaya in the Liga Indonesia Premier Division as a midfielder.

External links 
  

Indonesian footballers
Living people
1992 births
People from Bogor
Persikabo Bogor players
Lampung Sakti players
Indonesian Premier Division players
Association football midfielders
Sportspeople from West Java